The Lyubertsy constituency (No.121) is a Russian legislative constituency in Moscow Oblast. The constituency covers southeastern suburbs of Moscow.

Members elected

Election results

1993

|-
! colspan=2 style="background-color:#E9E9E9;text-align:left;vertical-align:top;" |Candidate
! style="background-color:#E9E9E9;text-align:left;vertical-align:top;" |Party
! style="background-color:#E9E9E9;text-align:right;" |Votes
! style="background-color:#E9E9E9;text-align:right;" |%
|-
|style="background-color:#B4C1C7"|
|align=left|Anatoly Guskov
|align=left|Future of Russia–New Names
|
|34.79%
|-
|style="background-color:#EA3C38"|
|align=left|Konstantin Lubenchenko
|align=left|Civic Union
| -
|10.10%
|-
| colspan="5" style="background-color:#E9E9E9;"|
|- style="font-weight:bold"
| colspan="3" style="text-align:left;" | Total
| 
| 100%
|-
| colspan="5" style="background-color:#E9E9E9;"|
|- style="font-weight:bold"
| colspan="4" |Source:
|
|}

1995

|-
! colspan=2 style="background-color:#E9E9E9;text-align:left;vertical-align:top;" |Candidate
! style="background-color:#E9E9E9;text-align:left;vertical-align:top;" |Party
! style="background-color:#E9E9E9;text-align:right;" |Votes
! style="background-color:#E9E9E9;text-align:right;" |%
|-
|style="background-color:"|
|align=left|Sergey Popov
|align=left|Independent
|
|16.97%
|-
|style="background-color:#F21A29"|
|align=left|Anatoly Dolgolaptev
|align=left|Trade Unions and Industrialists – Union of Labour
|
|14.75%
|-
|style="background-color:"|
|align=left|Ivan Yakushin
|align=left|Communist Party
|
|13.92%
|-
|style="background-color:"|
|align=left|Anatoly Guskov (incumbent)
|align=left|Independent
|
|12.83%
|-
|style="background-color:"|
|align=left|Yury Lyubashevsky
|align=left|Yabloko
|
|6.66%
|-
|style="background-color:"|
|align=left|Pyotr Oleynik
|align=left|Independent
|
|5.99%
|-
|style="background-color:#1C1A0D"|
|align=left|Bela Denisenko
|align=left|Forward, Russia!
|
|4.67%
|-
|style="background-color:#DA2021"|
|align=left|Boris Volynov
|align=left|Ivan Rybkin Bloc
|
|2.70%
|-
|style="background-color:#2C299A"|
|align=left|Vladimir Filin
|align=left|Congress of Russian Communities
|
|2.51%
|-
|style="background-color:"|
|align=left|Viktor Balakhovsky
|align=left|Liberal Democratic Party
|
|2.39%
|-
|style="background-color:#00A44E"|
|align=left|Andrey Klyuchnikov
|align=left|Bloc '89
|
|2.00%
|-
|style="background-color:"|
|align=left|Aleksey Vedenkin
|align=left|Independent
|
|1.88%
|-
|style="background-color:"|
|align=left|Tatyana Udovenko
|align=left|Independent
|
|1.20%
|-
|style="background-color:"|
|align=left|Lyudmila Kaziyeva
|align=left|Faith, Work, Conscience
|
|0.43%
|-
|style="background-color:#000000"|
|colspan=2 |against all
|
|8.52%
|-
| colspan="5" style="background-color:#E9E9E9;"|
|- style="font-weight:bold"
| colspan="3" style="text-align:left;" | Total
| 
| 100%
|-
| colspan="5" style="background-color:#E9E9E9;"|
|- style="font-weight:bold"
| colspan="4" |Source:
|
|}

1999

|-
! colspan=2 style="background-color:#E9E9E9;text-align:left;vertical-align:top;" |Candidate
! style="background-color:#E9E9E9;text-align:left;vertical-align:top;" |Party
! style="background-color:#E9E9E9;text-align:right;" |Votes
! style="background-color:#E9E9E9;text-align:right;" |%
|-
|style="background-color:#3B9EDF"|
|align=left|Yury Lipatov
|align=left|Fatherland – All Russia
|
|17.85%
|-
|style="background-color:"|
|align=left|Aleksandr Sokolov
|align=left|Communist Party
|
|14.44%
|-
|style="background-color:"|
|align=left|Vyacheslav Izmaylov
|align=left|Yabloko
|
|10.13%
|-
|style="background-color:"|
|align=left|Igor Volk
|align=left|Independent
|
|8.50%
|-
|style="background-color:"|
|align=left|Vladimir Lisichkin
|align=left|Independent
|
|7.72%
|-
|style="background-color:#1042A5"|
|align=left|Anatoly Shabad
|align=left|Union of Right Forces
|
|5.29%
|-
|style="background-color:#7C273A"|
|align=left|Anatoly Guskov
|align=left|Movement in Support of the Army
|
|3.61%
|-
|style="background-color:"|
|align=left|Zinaida Antontseva
|align=left|Russian All-People's Union
|
|3.04%
|-
|style="background-color:"|
|align=left|Sergey Bukhantsev
|align=left|Independent
|
|2.84%
|-
|style="background-color:"|
|align=left|Vladislav Belov
|align=left|Independent
|
|2.59%
|-
|style="background-color:"|
|align=left|Valery Skurlatov
|align=left|Independent
|
|2.08%
|-
|style="background-color:"|
|align=left|Andrey Petukhov
|align=left|Our Home – Russia
|
|1.40%
|-
|style="background-color:"|
|align=left|Aleksandr Voloshin
|align=left|Independent
|
|0.64%
|-
|style="background-color:#000000"|
|colspan=2 |against all
|
|17.51%
|-
| colspan="5" style="background-color:#E9E9E9;"|
|- style="font-weight:bold"
| colspan="3" style="text-align:left;" | Total
| 
| 100%
|-
| colspan="5" style="background-color:#E9E9E9;"|
|- style="font-weight:bold"
| colspan="4" |Source:
|
|}

2003

|-
! colspan=2 style="background-color:#E9E9E9;text-align:left;vertical-align:top;" |Candidate
! style="background-color:#E9E9E9;text-align:left;vertical-align:top;" |Party
! style="background-color:#E9E9E9;text-align:right;" |Votes
! style="background-color:#E9E9E9;text-align:right;" |%
|-
|style="background-color:"|
|align=left|Viktor Semyonov
|align=left|United Russia
|
|26.69%
|-
|style="background-color:"|
|align=left|Timur Artemyev
|align=left|Independent
|
|22.83%
|-
|style="background-color:#164C8C"|
|align=left|Aleksandr Garnayev
|align=left|United Russian Party Rus'
|
|13.94%
|-
|style="background-color:"|
|align=left|Sergey Pustovitovsky
|align=left|Independent
|
|4.12%
|-
|style="background-color:"|
|align=left|Yaroslav Nilov
|align=left|Liberal Democratic Party
|
|3.07%
|-
|style="background-color:#00A1FF"|
|align=left|Viktor Gladkikh
|align=left|Party of Russia's Rebirth-Russian Party of Life
|
|2.55%
|-
|style="background-color:#000000"|
|colspan=2 |against all
|
|23.91%
|-
| colspan="5" style="background-color:#E9E9E9;"|
|- style="font-weight:bold"
| colspan="3" style="text-align:left;" | Total
| 
| 100%
|-
| colspan="5" style="background-color:#E9E9E9;"|
|- style="font-weight:bold"
| colspan="4" |Source:
|
|}

2016

|-
! colspan=2 style="background-color:#E9E9E9;text-align:left;vertical-align:top;" |Candidate
! style="background-color:#E9E9E9;text-align:left;vertical-align:top;" |Party
! style="background-color:#E9E9E9;text-align:right;" |Votes
! style="background-color:#E9E9E9;text-align:right;" |%
|-
|style="background-color: " |
|align=left|Lidia Antonova
|align=left|United Russia
|
|49.28%
|-
|style="background-color:"|
|align=left|Pavel Grudinin
|align=left|Communist Party
|
|13.14%
|-
|style="background-color:"|
|align=left|Igor Chistyukhin
|align=left|A Just Russia
|
|9.43%
|-
|style="background-color:"|
|align=left|Andrey Khromov
|align=left|Liberal Democratic Party
|
|8.68%
|-
|style="background-color:"|
|align=left|Viktor Balabanov
|align=left|Yabloko
|
|4.31%
|-
|style="background:"| 
|align=left|Viktor Banov
|align=left|Communists of Russia
|
|2.95%
|-
|style="background-color:"|
|align=left|Vladimir Laktyushin
|align=left|Rodina
|
|2.73%
|-
|style="background:"| 
|align=left|Lyudmila Tropina
|align=left|Patriots of Russia
|
|2.53%
|-
|style="background:"| 
|align=left|Oleg Solsky
|align=left|Party of Growth
|
|1.75%
|-
|style="background-color:"|
|align=left|Vitaly Ozherelyev
|align=left|The Greens
|
|1.52%
|-
| colspan="5" style="background-color:#E9E9E9;"|
|- style="font-weight:bold"
| colspan="3" style="text-align:left;" | Total
| 
| 100%
|-
| colspan="5" style="background-color:#E9E9E9;"|
|- style="font-weight:bold"
| colspan="4" |Source:
|
|}

2021

|-
! colspan=2 style="background-color:#E9E9E9;text-align:left;vertical-align:top;" |Candidate
! style="background-color:#E9E9E9;text-align:left;vertical-align:top;" |Party
! style="background-color:#E9E9E9;text-align:right;" |Votes
! style="background-color:#E9E9E9;text-align:right;" |%
|-
|style="background-color:"|
|align=left|Roman Teryushkov
|align=left|United Russia
|
|44.80%
|-
|style="background-color:"|
|align=left|Oleg Yemelyanov
|align=left|Communist Party
|
|19.43%
|-
|style="background-color:"|
|align=left|Sergey Zhuravlev
|align=left|A Just Russia — For Truth
|
|8.42%
|-
|style="background-color:"|
|align=left|Andrey Khromov
|align=left|Liberal Democratic Party
|
|6.35%
|-
|style="background-color: " |
|align=left|Semyon Anosov
|align=left|New People
|
|4.89%
|-
|style="background-color: "|
|align=left|Aleksandr Zaytsev
|align=left|Party of Pensioners
|
|3.94%
|-
|style="background-color:"|
|align=left|Yulia Melnikova
|align=left|The Greens
|
|2.88%
|-
|style="background: "| 
|align=left|Viktor Balabanov
|align=left|Yabloko
|
|2.25%
|-
|style="background-color:"|
|align=left|Vladimir Laktyushin
|align=left|Rodina
|
|2.05%
|-
|style="background:"| 
|align=left|Sergey Goremykin
|align=left|Party of Growth
|
|1.40%
|-
| colspan="5" style="background-color:#E9E9E9;"|
|- style="font-weight:bold"
| colspan="3" style="text-align:left;" | Total
| 
| 100%
|-
| colspan="5" style="background-color:#E9E9E9;"|
|- style="font-weight:bold"
| colspan="4" |Source:
|
|}

Notes

References

Russian legislative constituencies
Politics of Moscow Oblast